Clare Dunn (born April 27, 1987) is an American country musician from southeast Colorado. After support from satellite radio as a "Highway Find" on The Highway (Sirius XM), she signed with Universal Music Group Nashville and BMG. She has opened for many notable country acts such as Florida Georgia Line, Luke Bryan, Bob Seger, Chris Young, Miranda Lambert, Keith Urban, Hank Williams Jr.,  and Trace Adkins.

Career
After moving to Nashville, Tennessee, Dunn sang backing vocals on Luke Bryan's "Country Girl (Shake It for Me)".

Dunn released her debut single, "Get Out," on December 17, 2013, and subsequently became the highest charting independent female artist on the Music Row Country Breakout chart in ten years. She released her second single, "Cowboy Side of You," on August 11, 2014. Dunn was also listed by Sounds Like Nashville as one of the artists to watch for 2017 in country music.

Two more singles from her self-titled EP — "Move On" and "Tuxedo" — were released in 2015 and 2016, respectively, and both charted on the Billboard Hot Country Songs and Country Airplay charts. Dunn's fifth single to country radio, "More," was released on June 4, 2018. In March 2020 Dunn parted ways with MCA Nashville. In May 2020, it was announced that Clare has joined Big Yellow Dog Music and released "Safe Haven" on May 1, 2020. A new single called "Salt and Lime" was released on May 22, 2020. Honestly: A Personal Collection EP was released on June 12, 2020 as her first release with Big Yellow Dog Music.

Personal life
In June of 2021, Dunn was assaulted by a Lyft driver in Nashville.

Discography

Extended plays

Singles

Music videos

References

American women country singers
American country singer-songwriters
Living people
MCA Records artists
Country musicians from Colorado
1987 births
21st-century American women
Singer-songwriters from Colorado